Matti Virmanen (born November 30, 1960 in Helsinki, Finland) is a retired Ice hockey player and currently a professional scout for the Edmonton Oilers. In addition, he works as a player coordinator for Finnish hockey league team Vaasan Sport.

Playing career

Jokerit
During his playing career, Virmanen played his only SM-liiga games for Jokerit. Virmanen played 4 games for Jokerit in 1980/81 SM-liiga season. During his junior seasons for Jokerit, Virmanen played on the same junior team with future NHL-player, Esa Tikkanen

Years in Norway
After Jokerit, Virmanen played 4 seasons for Norwegian team Djerv. Virmanen led the Norwegian League in points for 1982/83 season.

Return to Finland and Retirement
After his seasons in Norway, Virmanen returned to Finland and settled to Vantaa-area. Virmanen finished his playing career in Vantaa-HT for which he played for couple of seasons. Virmanen retired in 1997.

Virmanen made a short return as player in 2001/02 season when he played for Second Division team LeKi-75.

Career after Retirement
After Retirement, Virmanen worked in Jokerit organization, which he had joined in 1992. Virmanen replaced Leena Harkimo as the General Manager for Jokerit in 1999. Virmanen's tenure as General Manager ended in 2008 when he was moved to work as the Director of Sports Activities for Jokerit. Virmanen was succeeded as GM of Jokerit by Keijo Säilynoja.

References

External links

1960 births
Living people
Edmonton Oilers scouts
Jokerit players
Kiekko-Vantaa players
Ice hockey people from Helsinki
Finnish ice hockey forwards